In France, the agrégation is a competitive examination for civil service in the French public education system. Candidates for the examination, or agrégatifs, become agrégés once they are admitted to the position of professeur agrégé. In France, professeurs agrégés are distinguished from professeurs certifiés, recruited through the CAPES training. The agrégés are usually expected to teach in sixth-form colleges (lycées) and universities, while the certifiés usually teach in secondary schools (collèges), although there is a significant overlap.

The examination may require more than a year of preparation. The difficulty and selectivity (quota) vary from one discipline to another: there are about 300 such positions open each year for mathematics alone, but usually fewer positions are made available for humanities and social sciences (for example, 61 positions for philosophy were offered in 2018) and perhaps only one seat in some rarely taught foreign languages such as Japanese.

In addition to the vast majority of agrégés teaching in lycées, some agrégés teach in the preparatory classes to the grandes écoles or at the university level. Some agrégés teach in regular universities but do not, nominally, do scientific research as other university academics do; the positions are known as PRAG. Some positions including research (agrégé préparateur, AGPR) exist in the écoles normales supérieures, but they are very few.

The agrégation is typically open only to holders of a five-year university diploma (master's degree) or above. There is also an internal agrégation for professeurs certifiés, but it lacks the prestige of the external one although it remains selective (90 laureate/215 who passed the writing exams/873 who tried the writing exams/2001 candidates in 2010 in History-Geography). The following discusses the external one.

The competitive exam generally consists of a written section (admissibility) which, for humanities and social sciences, is composed of numerous essays and analyses of documents up to 7 hours in duration. This stage is when most candidates are eliminated.

The remaining candidates then have to go through an oral session (admission), composed of different exams in which candidates must demonstrate their ability to prepare and give lessons on any topic within the scope of his discipline. The oral exams provide the opportunity to verify that the candidates possess the appropriate speaking skills and have mastered the main exercises of their discipline; for example, in the Agrégation of Classics (French, Greek, Latin), candidates have to translate and comment on classical texts and texts from French literature. It is a way to establish whether candidates are able to fulfill requirements that they are going to need to satisfy.

In most disciplines, the lessons expected extend well above the secondary education level; indeed, the candidate may even have to present a lesson appropriate for the second, third, or even fourth years of specialized courses at the university level. One reason is that the agrégés should be able to teach in special undergraduate sections of high schools, known as preparatory classes to the grandes écoles and very similar in nature to grammar schools, and the level may be far above the normal level of the first or second year of college education.

The agrégation is also used as an unofficial national ranking system for students, giving a fair comparison between students of different universities. That is especially true in the humanities, for which the agrégation is highly selective and supposedly demonstrates erudition of the candidate.

Students of the écoles normales supérieures, as well as graduate students who have just completed their master's degree, often dedicate an entire year of their curriculum to prepare for the agrégation.

List of agrégations 

 Enseignement des langues vivantes 
 Agrégation d'allemand (Agrégation of German language)
 Agrégation d'anglais (Agrégation of English language)
 Agrégation d'arabe (Agrégation of Arabic language)
 Agrégation de chinois (Agrégation of Chinese language)
 Agrégation d'espagnol (Agrégation of Spanish language)
 Agrégation d'hébreu moderne (Agrégation of Hebrew language)
 Agrégation d'italien (Agrégation of Italian language)
 Agrégation de japonais (Agrégation of Japanese language)
 Agrégation de polonais (Agrégation of Polish language)
 Agrégation de russe (Agrégation of Russian language)
 Agrégation de portugais (Agrégation of Portuguese language)

 Lettres et sciences humaines 
 Agrégation d'histoire (Agrégation of history)
 Agrégation de géographie (Agrégation of geography)
 Agrégation de grammaire (Agrégation of grammar)
 Agrégation de lettres classiques (Agrégation of classics)
 Agrégation de lettres modernes (Agrégation of modern literature)
 Agrégation de philosophie (Agrégation of philosophy)

 Économie 
 Agrégation de sciences économiques et sociales (Agrégation of economics and social sciences)
 option histoire et géographie du monde contemporain (history and geography of modern world - from the industrial revolution)
 option science politique et droit public (political science and public law)
 Agrégation d'économie/gestion  (Agrégation of economics and management) :
 option A : économie et gestion administrative,
 option B : économie et gestion compatible et financière,
 option C : économie et gestion commerciale,
 option D : économie, informatique et gestion.

Although both Agrégations are labeled as Agrégation of economics, the Agrégation of economics and social sciences is more oriented towards political economy whereas the Agrégation of economics and management is more oriented towards business economics.

 Enseignement des sciences naturelles et physiques 
 Agrégation de mathématiques (Agrégation of mathematics)
 option informatique théorique
 option statistique et probabilités
 option calcul scientifique
 option algèbre formelle
 Agrégation de sciences de la vie - sciences de la Terre et de l'Univers (Agrégation of biology-geology)
 Agrégation de sciences physiques (Agrégation of physics-chemistry)
 option physique
 option chimie
 option physique appliquée
 option procédés physico-chimiques
 Agrégation d’informatique (Agrégation in computer science) which was created in 2022 

 Enseignement professionnel et technique 
 Agrégation de biochimie - génie biologique (Agrégation of biochemistry - biology)
 Agrégation de génie civil (Agrégation of civil engineering)
 Agrégation de génie mécanique (Agrégation of mechanical engineering)
 Agrégation de génie électrique (Agrégation of electrical engineering)
 Agrégation de génie informatique (Agrégation of informatical engineering)
 Agrégation de mécanique (Agrégation of mechanics)

 Enseignements artistiques
 Agrégation d'arts :  (Agrégation of arts)
 option arts plastiques (Agrégation of visual arts)
 option arts appliqués (Agrégation of applied arts)
 option histoire des arts (Agrégation of arts' history)
 Agrégation de musique (Agrégation of music)

 Enseignement d'éducation physique 
 Agrégation d'éducation physique et sportive (Agrégation of physical education and sports)

In higher education 
In some disciplines of higher education such as law, legal history, political science, economics, management, there exists an agrégation for the professorship positions, called agrégation de l'enseignement supérieur. In this competitive exam, the candidate also has to give several lessons in front of a committee.
Usually there are three lessons, spread over several months, except in economics, where there are only two lessons.  
The first and the last lessons have to be prepared alone, during eight hours, in a library of basic titles selected by the committee. For the remaining lesson, when it exists, the candidate has a full 24 hours to prepare for the examination, and may use several libraries as well as a team of "helpers" (usually doctoral candidates or fellow candidates, but never full professors).

Some anticonformist sociologists like Pierre Bourdieu have argued that this exam measures a candidate's social connections as much their ability to present a lesson, especially considering the composition of the examining committee.

 Agrégation de droit (Agrégation of law)
 Agrégation de droit privé (Agrégation of private law)
 Agrégation de droit public (Agrégation of public law)
 Agrégation d'histoire du droit (Agrégation of legal history)
 Agrégation de science politique (Agrégation of political science)
 Agrégation d'économie (Agrégation of economics ; not to be confused with the agrégations for secondary education that are the agrégation de sciences économiques et sociales and  the agrégation d'économie et de gestion) 
 Agrégation de gestion (Agrégation of management ; not to be confused with the agrégation for secondary education that is the agrégation d'économie et de gestion)

Some well known agrégés 

philosophers Alain Badiou (philosophy), Henri Bergson (philosophy), Jean-Paul Sartre (philosophy), Simone de Beauvoir (philosophy), Raymond Aron (philosophy), Michel Foucault (philosophy) Jacques Derrida (philosophy), André Glucksmann (philosophy), Alain Finkielkraut (Modern Letters), Luc Ferry (philosophy), Louis Althusser (philosophy), Simone Weil (philosophy), André Comte-Sponville (philosophy); Jean-François Lyotard (Philosophy)
anthropologist Claude Lévi-Strauss (philosophy), etc. 
politicians Jean Jaurès (philosophy), Georges Pompidou (Letters), Alain Juppé (Agrégation in Classics), Jacques Legendre (Agrégation in History and Geography), Laurent Fabius (lettres modernes), Marisol Touraine (Agrégation in Economics and Social Science), Bruno Le Maire (Modern Letters), Aurélie Filippetti (Classics), Laurent Wauquiez (History), François Bayrou (Classics), Xavier Darcos (Classics), etc. 
writers Jean-Paul de Dadelsen (agrégé in German), translator of Nathan Katz among others., translator of Virgil, Julien Gracq (Agrégation in History and Geography), aka: Louis Poirier, Jules Romains aka: Louis Farigoule (philosophie), Daniel-Rops (histoire-géographie) aka: Henri Petiot, Henri Queffélec (lettres), Jean-Louis Curtis (English), Patrick Grainville (Agrégation in Modern Letters), Dominique Fernandez (Agrégation in Italian), Danielle Sallenave (letters), etc.;
hellenist Jacqueline de Romilly (Classics), etc., linguist Georges Dumézil (Classics);
mathematician Cédric Villani, recipient of Fields Medal;
physicists Pierre-Gilles de Gennes, recipient of Nobel Prize in Physics, and Philippe Nozières;

See also 
Habilitation

References

Further reading
 
 Chervel André, Compere Marie-Madeleine, "Les candidats aux trois concours pour l'agrégation de l'Université de Paris (1766–1791)", juin 2002
 Verneuil, Yves, Les agrégés: histoire d'une exception française. Paris, Belin, 2005, 367 p.

Education in France
French Civil Service